is a Filipino-Japanese actor, singer and songwriter known for being a member and lead vocalist of the Filipino boy group BGYO. Morishita has co-written several tracks released by BGYO: "The Light" (2021), "Runnin'" (2021), "The Baddest" (2021), "Kundiman" (2021), "Fly Away" (2021) and an original soundtrack for a series Bola Bola entiled "Mahal Na Kita" (2022), of which he released a solo version of the song.

Prior to his music career, Morishita started as an actor known for four movies: "Sundalong Kanin (Rice Soldiers)" (2014), "Alienasyon" (2014), "Kalel, 15" (2019), "'Tol" (2019); a television series All of Me (2015) and have appeared on several television commercials aired in the Philippines: Jollibee, Cherifer and Royal.

In March 2022, he became part of iWantTFC's original miniseries Bola Bola.

Early life
Akira Morishita was born on the 27 April 2001 to a Japanese father and a Filipino mother; both of them worked as musicians in Japan. At a young age, he aspired to become part of the military or the airforce but these were put aside when their family needed financial support by auditioning him for television and print ads.

Career

Television and film career
His career in the entertainment industry began in 2014 when he played the role of Carding in the indie film Sundalong Kanin, a Cinemalaya film entry by Janice O'Hara that served as his first film appearance. He also appeared in other independent films including Alienasyon, also in 2014 and Kalel, 15 in 2019. In 2015, he made his first television appearance in ABS-CBN's afternoon drama series All of Me, playing the role of Ringo Dimaculangan.

In 2022, while being a member of BGYO, he returned to acting through a main role in iWantTFC's teen romantic comedy series Bola Bola, starring Francine Diaz, KD Estrada, and Ashton Salvador. He plays Lucas Benitez, the long-time crush of Diaz's character Thea Balderama. He and his co-members from BGYO served as the performers of the show's theme song "Mahal Na Kita".

Musical career

He joined the Star Hunt Academy after he met and was recommended by Laurenti M. Dyogi, ABS-CBN's resident director and head of its entertainment division. Morishita was part of the original trainees of the Star Hunt Academy program, alongside Nate Porcalla, in 2018 and became part of "SHA Boys". He and his four co-members were trained for two years under Filipino and South Korean mentors from MU Doctor Academy; vocal coach Kitchy Molina; and dance coach Mickey Perz. They were officially announced in the pre-show of PBB Otso Big Night as Star Hunt trainees on August 3, 2019.

Artistry
Morishita have cited Ed Sheeran and Shawn Mendes as musical inspirations.

Impact and influence
Aside from being an idol, Morishita was known also as a dean's lister of his class.

Personal life
He was raised in Bulacan with his three sisters and one brother. His hobbies are drawing and painting, and playing various sports including basketball where he was a varsity player in high school, and eventually, he became part of the Star Magic All-Star Games; tennis; and badminton. A fan of anime, he cites Demon Slayer: Kimetsu no Yaiba and its main character Tanjiro Kamado as his favorite anime and character, respectively.

Discography

Soundtracks

Production credits 
All song credits are adapted from the Tidal, unless otherwise noted.

Filmography

Film

Television (linear and digital)

Series

Webcast

Awards and nominations

Notes

References

External links

 

BGYO
Members of BGYO
Living people
2001 births
Filipino people of Japanese descent
Star Music artists
ABS-CBN personalities
21st-century Filipino male singers
Filipino male models
Filipino male film actors
Filipino male television actors